Anttonen is a Finnish surname. Notable people with the surname include:

Matti Anttonen (born 1957), Finnish diplomat
Patrik Anttonen (born 1980), Swedish footballer
Sari Anttonen (born 1991), Finnish orienteering competitor

Finnish-language surnames
Patronymic surnames